Cameroon competed at the 2018 Commonwealth Games in the Gold Coast, Australia from April 4 to April 15, 2018. It was Cameroon's 6th appearance at the Commonwealth Games. During the games, eight athletes went missing from their accommodation, with them all being reported to the Australian police.

Medalists

Competitors
The following is the list of number of competitors participating at the Games per sport/discipline.

Athletics

Men
Field events

Women
Track & road events

Field events

Badminton

Cameroon participated with 2 athletes (1 man and 1 woman)

Basketball

Cameroon qualified a men's basketball team of 12 athletes. The team was invited by FIBA and the CGF. The country will make its Commonwealth Games debut at the games. Cameroon did not compete in the sport at its only appearance in 2006 in Melbourne.

Men's tournament

Roster

Ebaku Akumenzoh
Christian Ayangma Bemouyime
Simon Bileg II
Felix Bogmis
Pierre Cedric Essome
Arnold Kome
Boseme Mukete Njemo
Kevin Ngwese
Mohaman Aziz Nkene Tsaace
Yannick Seulle
Robert Songolo Ngijol
Franck Yangue

Pool B

Boxing

Cameroon participated with a team of 8 athletes (5 men and 3 women)

Men

Women

Weightlifting

Cameroon participated with 5 athletes (3 men and 2 women).

Wrestling

Cameroon participated with 6 athletes (2 men and 4 women).

Repechage Format

Group Stage Format

Nordic Format

See also
Cameroon at the 2018 Summer Youth Olympics

References

Nations at the 2018 Commonwealth Games
Cameroon at the Commonwealth Games
2018 in Cameroonian sport